Palazzo Corner Valmarana is a palace in Venice, located in the San Marco district and overlooking the Grand Canal. It locates not far from the Ponte di Rialto, between Palazzo Cavalli and Palazzo Grimani di San Luca.

History
It is a 16th-century building, but completely renovated in the second half of the 19th century, with interventions that favored the chromatic and decorative aspects of architecture.

Architecture
The façade is of four floors and overlooks the left bank of the Grand Canal, immediately before Palazzo Grimani di San Luca. Each of two noble floors features a trifora flanked by pairs of monoforas. The mezzanine attic has rectangular windows; all other openings are arched. The facade is pained bright orange and decorated with marble paterae, white string courses, and other moldings. The palace houses municipal offices.

See also
Palazzo Smith Mangilli Valmarana
Valmarana family

References

Palaces in Sestiere San Marco
Palaces on the Grand Canal (Venice)
Buildings and structures completed in the 16th century
Medieval Italian architecture
Renaissance architecture in Venice